Xianxia may refer to:

 Xianxia (genre), a subset of Chinese wuxia fiction
 Xianxia, Anhui, town in Ningguo, Anhui, China
 Xianxia Township, Yudu County, Jiangxi, China